KSK Chaitanya (born 6 September 1995) is an Indian cricketer who plays for Hyderabad. He made his first-class debut in the 2018–19 Ranji Trophy against the Bengal.

References

External links
 

1995 births
Living people
Indian cricketers
Hyderabad cricketers